Love from a Stranger is a 1936 play based on "Philomel Cottage", a 1924 short story by British mystery writer Agatha Christie.

Background
The play was adapted by Frank Vosper and opened at the New Theatre on 31 March 1936. Vosper starred in the play, which was later turned into a successful film. Promotional extracts were broadcast on the BBC Regional Programme on 1 May 1936 in a 20-minute programme with members of the then-current stage cast.

On 9 May 1936, the final performance was given at the New Theatre, and the play immediately transferred to the Queen's Theatre on11 May, where it ran until 8 August 1936. It reopened two days later at the Streatham Hill Theatre for one week.

Reception of London production
The play garnered good reviews with the Daily Herald stating that it was "a brilliant terror play" and "our blood was gloriously curdled last night". The Times was equally enthusiastic stating "The final act is very sure of its effect. The suspense is maintained; each turn of the story is clear and striking; the terror-stricken self-control of the girl and the man's gross and abominable insanity are depicted by Miss Marie Ney and Mr Vosper with every refinement of a murderous thriller. Within the limits of its purpose, the acting of this scene could scarcely be bettered." It is claimed that the climax was so chilling to members of the audience that some fainted with the suspense.

Ivor Brown in The Observer of 5 April 1936 wrote "There is authentic and tremendous suspense about the struggle between Bruce and his captive wife. One feels that, if any bird did nest near this cottage, it would be the croaking raven or fatal owl." Frank Vosper's performance was described as "very clever" and "a first-rate study of disintegration, in which the muscle of the first act becomes the fearsome flabbiness of the last. Both the chief players have to change character during the play, which, since this is well done, gives it a special acting-value apart from its interest of plot and problem."

The Scotsman of 1 April 1936 started its review with: "To watch the performance of Love from a Stranger at the New Theatre is like witnessing a clever conjuring show. One knows that all that is apparently happening is next to impossible, yet one cannot fail to be thrilled." The review went on to state "Mr Frank Vosper achieves with great art the transformation from a pleasant young Colonial to a habitual murderer. The scene where he gradually reveals his true character by tearing up his wife's scarf in a paroxysm of murderous fury is invested by him with a realism that is almost horrible. It was difficult to assess the performance of Miss Marie Ney because it was difficult to believe that she would ever have placed herself in such a situation."

Credits of the London production
 Director: Murray MacDonald
 Frank Vosper as Bruce Lovell
 Muriel Aked as Louise Garrard
 Norah Howard as Mavis Wilson
 Marie Ney as Cecily Harrington
 Geoffrey King as Nigel Lawrence
 Charles Hodges as Hodgson
 Esma Cannon as Ethel
 S Major Jones as Dr. Gribble

Broadway production
Vosper took the play to New York where it ran from 21 September to c. 1 November 1936 for 38 performances. The first week (up to 28 September) was at the Erlanger Theatre and from then until the closure of the play it ran at the Fulton Theatre

Credits of the Broadway production
 Director: Auriol Lee
 A.G. Andrews as Hodgson
 Leslie Austen as Nigel Lawrence
 George Graham as Dr. Gribble
 Jessie Royce Landis as Cecily Harrington
 Mildred Natwick as Ethel
 Minna Phillips as Louise Garrard
 Olive Reeves-Smith as Mavis Wilson
 Frank Vosper as Bruce Lovell

Publication and other adaptations

The play was first published by William Collins in June 1936 in  hardback and paperback editions and then re-issued by Samuel French Ltd in 1937.

The play was twice turned into a film. The 1937 British production starred Basil Rathbone and Ann Harding and was released in the U.S. as A Night of Terror. The 1947 remake starred John Hodiak and Sylvia Sidney and was released in the UK as A Stranger Walked In.

The play was also televised twice by the BBC: on 23 November 1938 and 25 May 1947, both as live performances.

A radio version of the play was presented on the BBC Home Service on 24 March 1945 as part of the Saturday Night Theatre strand. The play was produced by Howard Rose.

Cast:
 Josephine Shand as Louise Garrard
 Ann Farrar as Mavis Wilson
 Grizelda Hervey as Cecily Harrington
 John Clements as Bruce Lovell
 Richard Williams as Nigel Lawrence
 Ian Sadler as Hodgson
 Freda Falconer as Ethel
 Cecil Fowler as Dr. Gribble

A second radio version was broadcast on the General Forces Programme on 9 May 1945 and was produced by Martyn C. Webster. This version was repeated on 4 July.

Cast:
 Pamela Brown as Cecily Harrington
 John Slater as Bruce Lovell
 Alan Howland as Nigel Lawrence
 Rita Vale as Mavis Wilson
 Dora Gregory as Louise Garrard
 Patric Curwen as Dr Gribble
 Frank Tickle as Hodgson
 Ellinore Stuart as Ethel

A BBC Radio 4 play was broadcast on 14 January 2002.

An adaptation by Louise Page opened on 14 April 2010 at The Mill at Sonning in Berkshire, England. The cast included Chloe Newsome, Dido Miles, Peter Moreton, David Michaels, and Struan Rodger.

References

Plays by Agatha Christie
Plays by Frank Vosper
1936 plays
West End plays
British plays adapted into films